Galloping Bungalows: The Rise and Demise of the American House Trailer (Archon 1991 ) is a book by David A. Thornburg that discusses Americans taking to homes on wheels. It combines his own experiences with two years of research.

References

1991 non-fiction books
American non-fiction books